Rebić is a Croatian and Serbian surname. Notable people with the surname include:

Ante Rebić (born 1993), Croatian professional footballer
Nikola Rebić (born 1995), Serbian professional basketballer

See also

Ribić

Croatian surnames
Serbian surnames
Slavic-language surnames